The men's 1500 metres race of the 2013–14 ISU Speed Skating World Cup 2, arranged in the Utah Olympic Oval, in Salt Lake City, United States, was held on November 15, 2013.

Shani Davis of the United States won the race, while Brian Hansen, also of the United States, came second, and Koen Verweij of the Netherlands came third. Haralds Silovs of Latvia won the Division B race.

Results
The race took place on Friday, November 15, with Division B scheduled in the morning session, at 10:10, and Division A scheduled in the afternoon session, at 16:20.

Division A

Division B

References

Men 1500
2